In enzymology, an aldehyde dehydrogenase (NAD+) is an enzyme that catalyzes the chemical reaction

an aldehyde + NAD+ + H2O  an acid + NADH + H+

The 3 substrates of this enzyme are aldehyde, NAD+, and H2O, whereas its 3 products are acid, NADH, and H+.

This enzyme belongs to the family of oxidoreductases, specifically those acting on the aldehyde or oxo group of donor with NAD+ or NADP+ as acceptor.  The systematic name of this enzyme class is aldehyde:NAD+ oxidoreductase. Other names in common use include CoA-independent aldehyde dehydrogenase, m-methylbenzaldehyde dehydrogenase, NAD-aldehyde dehydrogenase, NAD-dependent 4-hydroxynonenal dehydrogenase, NAD-dependent aldehyde dehydrogenase, NAD-linked aldehyde dehydrogenase, propionaldehyde dehydrogenase, and aldehyde dehydrogenase (NAD).  This enzyme participates in 17 metabolic pathways: glycolysis / gluconeogenesis, ascorbate and aldarate metabolism, fatty acid metabolism, bile acid biosynthesis, urea cycle and metabolism of amino groups, valine, leucine and isoleucine degradation, lysine degradation, histidine metabolism, tryptophan metabolism, beta-alanine metabolism, glycerolipid metabolism, pyruvate metabolism, 1,2-dichloroethane degradation, propanoate metabolism, 3-chloroacrylic acid degradation, butanoate metabolism, and limonene and pinene degradation.

References

External links 
 
 

EC 1.2.1
NADH-dependent enzymes
Enzymes of known structure